New Season(s) may refer to:
 New Season (Chisato Moritaka album), 1987
 "New Season" (song), a 1987 song by Chisato Moritaka
 New Season (Kym album), 2007
 New Season (Donny and Marie Osmond album), 1976
 New Seasons (album), a 2007 album by The Sadies
 New Seasons Market, a grocery store with eighteen locations in the Portland metropolitan area.

See also
 The New Season, a 2006 album by Brotha Lynch Hung and MC Eiht
"The New Season", a song by Clint Mansell from the 2010 Black Swan soundtrack
New Seasons Market, an American west-coast grocery chain